Valeri Vladimirovich Aleskarov (born 19 August 1971) is a Russian professional football coach and a former player. He is a goalkeepers' coach with FC Rotor Volgograd.

Club career
Aleskarov made his professional debut in the Soviet Second League B in 1991 for FC Neftekhimik Nizhnekamsk. He also played for FC Rubin Kazan.

After he retired from playing football, Aleskarov became a goalkeeping coach, with spells at Neftekhimik Nizhnekamsk, FC Murom and Rotor Volgograd.

Honours
 Russian Premier League bronze: 2003.

References

1971 births
People from Ruzayevka
Living people
Soviet footballers
Russian footballers
Association football goalkeepers
Russian Premier League players
FC Rubin Kazan players
FC KAMAZ Naberezhnye Chelny players
FC Neftekhimik Nizhnekamsk players
Sportspeople from Mordovia